The following is a list of villages in Kyiv Oblast in Ukraine.

Bila Tserkva Raion 

 Burkivtsi

 Kivshovata
 Kovalivka
 Marianivka
 Sokolivka
 Telizhyntsi

Boryspil Raion 

 Bohdanivka
 Bozhky
 Chubynske
 Dvirkivshchyna
 Glanyshiv
 Kapustyntsi
 Prolisky
 Shchaslyve

Brovary Raion 

 Arkadiyivka

 Bziv
 Hoholiv
 Kniazhychi
 Litky
 Lukianivka
 Shevchenkove
 Zavorychi

Bucha Raion 

 Bilohorodka
 Blystavytsia
 Bucha (village)
 Buzova
 Horenka
 Horenychi
 Kriukivshchyna
 Lubianka
 Motyzhyn
 Mykhailivka-Rubezhivka
 Myrotske
 Petropavlivska Borshchahivka

Fastiv Raion 

 Bahryn

 Dovha Hreblya
 Hatne
 Hruzke
 Krushynka
 Markhalivka
 Motovylivka
 Putrivka
 Vepryk
 Yasnohorodka
 Zelenyi Bir

Obukhiv Raion 

 Barakhty
 Hermanivka
 Khotiv
 Trypillia
 Velykyi Bukryn

Vyshhorod Raion 

 Abramivka

 Andriivka
 Demydiv
 Dibrova
 Dytiatky
 Hornostaipil
 Huta-Mezhyhirska
 Khotianivka
 Kopachi
 Novi Petrivtsi
 Obukhovychi
 Opachychi
 Tarasy
 Yaniv

Kyiv